Thomas Galloway FRS (26 February 17961 November 1851) was a 19th-century Scottish mathematician.

Life

He was born in Symington, South Lanarkshire, Scotland. In 1812 he entered the University of Edinburgh, where he distinguished himself in mathematics. In 1823 he was appointed one of the teachers of mathematics at the Royal Military College, Sandhurst, and in 1833 he became an actuary of the Amicable Life Assurance Office, the oldest institution of that kind in London, where he remained until his death in 1851. Galloway was a voluminous, though, for the most part, anonymous writer. His most notable paper, "On the proper motion of the solar system", was published in the Philosophical Transactions of 1847. He contributed largely to the seventh edition of Encyclopædia Britannica, and also wrote several scientific papers for the Edinburgh Review and various scientific journals. His Encyclopaedia article, "Probability", was published separately. He is buried in Kensal Green Cemetery, London.

Family

Galloway was married to Margaret Wallace (1809–1884), daughter of the mathematician William Wallace. She is buried next to her father in Greyfriars Kirkyard in Edinburgh.

Notes

External links
 
 

Scottish mathematicians
1796 births
1851 deaths
Royal Medal winners
19th-century British mathematicians
People from South Lanarkshire
Fellows of the Royal Society
Alumni of the University of Edinburgh
Burials at Kensal Green Cemetery
Academics of the Royal Military College, Sandhurst
British actuaries
19th-century British businesspeople